Attagenus pellio, the fur beetle or carpet beetle, is a pest which damages stored products such as furs, skins, textiles and grain.

Attagenus pelio is a 4–6 mm-long oval shaped insect with two patches of white hair on the elytra.

See also
 Home stored product entomology

References
Granousky TA. 1997. Stored Product Pests. In Handbook of Pest Control, 8th Ed. Hedges SA, Moreland D (editors). Mallis Handbook and Technical Training Company

External links
Dermestidae of the World Habitus and antennae of the male.

Dermestidae
Beetles described in 1758
Taxa named by Carl Linnaeus